Amengual is a surname. Notable people with the surname include:

Claudia Amengual (born 1969), Uruguayan writer and translator
René Amengual (1911–1954), Chilean composer, educator and pianist

Catalan-language surnames